The Set the World on Fire Tour was the fifth concert tour by American recording artist Alicia Keys in support of her fifth studio album, Girl on Fire (2012). The tour ranked 22nd on Pollstar's annual "Top 100 Worldwide Tours – Year End". It earned nearly $44 million from 70/74 shows.

Background
Alicia Keys announced 6 UK and Ireland Arena dates following a performance on The X Factor. Tickets for the show went on sale on 23 November 2012 and almost immediately an extra date was added at The O2 Arena in London due to the high-demand. The American leg of the tour was announced on 10 January 2013 and the pre-sale tickets went on sale on Jan 14th. General sale tickets went on sale on January 18 and many of the dates sold-out within hours.

Opening acts
Miguel (North America, Europe) (select dates)
John Legend (Australia)
Bluey Robinson  (Liverpool, Newcastle)
André Henriques (Lisbon)
Jason Derulo (Dubai)

Setlist
"Karma"
"You Don't Know My Name"
"Tears Always Win"
"Listen to Your Heart"
"Like You'll Never See Me Again"
"A Woman's Worth"
"Diary"
"Love You Down"
"Un-Thinkable (I'm Ready)"
"Try Sleeping with a Broken Heart"
"101"
"Fallin'"
"I'll Be There for You/You're All I Need to Get By" (Performed by background vocalists)
"When It's All Over"
"Fire We Make"
"Unbreakable"
"Not Even the King"
"If I Ain't Got You"
"No One"
"New Day"
"Murder She Wrote"
"Girl On Fire"
Encore
"Brand New Me"
"Empire State of Mind (Part II) Broken Down"
Source:

Tour dates

Festivals and other miscellaneous performances
Atlantis Live
Blackberry Live: The Keep Moving Experience
Istanbul International Jazz Festival
Flow Festival
Way Out West
Central Park Summer Concert Series
Rock in Rio
Global Citizen Festival
The Black Ball
A Day on the Green

Cancellations and rescheduled shows

Box office score data

Notes 
1.Data from study is collected from all worldwide concerts held between January 1 and June 30, 2013. All monetary figures are based in U.S. dollars. All information is based upon extensive research conducted by Pollstar.

References

External links 

2013 concert tours
Alicia Keys concert tours